David Ouimet (born 1965) is an American artist, author, and musician. He was a band member of Cop Shoot Cop, Motherhead Bug, Firewater, and Sulfur but has since moved on to interests other than music.

He grew up in Memphis, Tennessee, in a music oriented household. Having been introduced to synthesizers in his teenage years, he developed an interest in editing. He studied Film at Rhode Island School of Design where he developed a friendship with his future bandmate Tod Ashley.

In the early 1990s, Ouimet co-founded the noise rock group Cop Shoot Cop, playing sampler and keyboards. He left after their first album to form the legendary Gypsy Klezmer Punk outfit Motherhead Bug, as songwriter, vocalist and trombonist. He has also recorded and toured with Foetus and Swans.

Ouimet's illustrations of creepy, bipedal, fez-capped insect creatures (usually wielding scimitars or smoking hookahs) appeared on Motherhead Bug's singles and album, and he has continued his career as an illustrator with Robert D. San Souci's Dare to be Scared series and Nancy Etchmendy's Cat in Glass and other Tales of the Unnatural.

"Daydreams for Night", stories by the Canadian musician John Southworth and illustrated by David Ouimet, was published by Simply Read books in 2015. School Library Journal described the book as "gorgeously illustrated" and Publishers Weekly noted "Ouimet's haunting b&w illustrations follows in the tradition of Shaun Tan's Tales of Suburbia and Chris Van Allsburg's Mysteries of Harris Burdock." Ouimet created an animated trailer for the book.

In 2015 Ouimet began modeling and has appeared in magazines, billboards, and major international print advertising campaigns.

A Japanese edition of "Daydreams for Night" was published by Asuka Shinsha Japan in January 2016.

Ouimet's work was selected for the Society of Illustrators Annual 59 and was exhibited at the Museum of American Illustration in New York City in February 2017.

His street art began appearing in New York City in 2016 and has since appeared throughout the world. Ouimet's primary imagery revolves around his Hoodiebird characters, cloaked birds generally embellished with ornate filagree.

In September 2019 Ouimet's debut book as an author and illustrator, "I Go Quiet", was published in the UK, Australia, New Zealand, South Africa and India by Canongate Books. In early 2020 the book was published in the U.S. by W.W. Norton, and in a Portuguese edition by Companhia das Letras, A Turkish Edition by Cinar, a German edition by MVG Verlag, an Italian edition by Terre di Mezzo Editore, a Spanish edition by Minotauro, and a Chinese Edition by the CITIC Press Group, among others.

"I Get Loud", the follow-up to "I Go Quiet" will be published in the summer of 2021.

"I Go Quiet" was the winner of the 2020 East Sussex Children's Book Award, and has been shortlisted for the 2021 Kate Greenaway Medal.

Bibliography

Discography

References 

American male singers
Singers from Tennessee
20th-century American artists
American trombonists
Male trombonists
American electronic musicians
Noise rock musicians
Cop Shoot Cop members
Firewater (band) members
Living people
People from Memphis, Tennessee
1965 births
21st-century trombonists
21st-century American male musicians